WDVM-TV (channel 25) is an independent television station licensed to Hagerstown, Maryland, United States, serving the Washington, D.C. television market. It is owned by Nexstar Media Group alongside CW owned-and-operated station WDCW (channel 50). The two stations share studios on Wisconsin Avenue in the Glover Park section of Washington; WDVM-TV's transmitter is located on Fairview Mountain, west of Clear Spring, Maryland.

History
The station signed on the air as WHAG-TV on January 3, 1970. It was originally owned by Warren Adler along with WHAG radio in Halfway (AM 1410 and FM 96.7, now WDLD). WHAG-TV's original analog transmitter was to be on top of the Hagerstown Motor Inn (now the Alexander House) but was rejected due to structural incompatibility. A site on Fairview Mountain would become the location of the analog signal on UHF channel 25. The station was an NBC affiliate; network anchors Chet Huntley and David Brinkley welcomed the station to the network during their newscast that night.

Adler Communications sold WHAG-TV to Sheldon and Samuel Magazine of Washington, D.C., in 1973. The Magazine brothers then sold it to local aviation pioneer Richard Henson in 1977. Henson then sold the station to Great Trails Broadcasting in 1981. Great Trails then exited broadcasting and sold WHAG along with 2 of its stations—WFFT-TV in Fort Wayne, Indiana, and KSVI in Billings, Montana, to Quorum Broadcasting in 1998 for $65 million.

On September 8, 2003, Nexstar Broadcasting Group announced that it would acquire Quorum Broadcasting and its stations (including WHAG-TV) for $230 million. The sale was completed on December 31, 2003.

Loss of NBC affiliation

NBC confirmed to The Herald-Mail that it was declining to renew its affiliation with WHAG on February 19, 2016; the station ceased broadcasting network programming on July 1. A factor in this decision was perceived competition with network-owned WRC-TV, and the network taking a 'one in each market' approach to affiliates for ratings purposes. Since 2014, NBC revoked affiliations from several affiliates, including WHAG-TV, WMGM-TV (whose broadcast area was served by network-owned WCAU), and KENV-DT (whose broadcast area was served by KSL-TV), that functioned as secondary NBC stations serving outlying areas of their larger markets. In addition to expanding local news, WHAG-TV also added programs from Heroes & Icons at the time. The last NBC program to air on WHAG was Last Call with Carson Daly.

As WDVM-TV

On July 1, 2017, the station rebranded itself and adopted the call sign WDVM-TV. The change came after the station expanded its coverage area by 1.2 million households, with news director Mark Kraham stating that "we wanted to make it clear that we're not just a Hagerstown station." The callsign had previously been used in the market by what is now WUSA from 1978 through 1986.

On December 3, 2018, Nexstar announced it would acquire the assets of Chicago-based Tribune Media—which has owned Washington-based CW affiliate WDCW (channel 50) since 1999—for $6.4 billion in cash and debt. The sale was approved by the Federal Communications Commission (FCC) on September 16 and was completed on September 19, 2019, forming a nominal duopoly with WDCW.

On July 1, 2019, all Heroes & Icons programming was dropped in favor of additional syndicated programming. Nexstar began repositioning WDVM-TV as a news-intensive independent station focused on the Washington market, first combining the operations of their two stations by bringing WDCW and WDVM-TV under the same management in February 2020. Later in the year, WDVM-TV added rebroadcasts of syndicated programming seen on WDCW, while that station added a standard-definition simulcast to allow over-the-air coverage of WDVM-TV to the entire market along with expanded cable and satellite carriage. Nexstar then applied to the FCC to move WDVM-TV's transmitter site to a tower at Raven Rocks in Jefferson County, West Virginia, along with a power increase to 1,000 kW; this move is to substantially increase over-the-air coverage of Washington and suburban northern Virginia at the expense of the Hagerstown area and south-central Pennsylvania.  

After the FCC requested several rounds of reports and technical changes to minimize the population in rural Maryland and Pennsylvania that would lose what the commission considers adequate local broadcast television coverage (within the Longley-Rice noise-limited contour of five full-powered or Class A stations), the relocation was approved on May 16, 2022. The relocation has yet to occur, as the presence of Daystar's WDDN-LD and WDWA-LD on channel 23 in Washington and Burke, Virginia, respectively, present another technical obstacle.

News operation
Right from the start (January 3, 1970), WHAG began offering local newscasts with The Valley News which aired weeknights at 6, 7, and 11. The original anchors were Bob Witt with news, Glenn Presgraves with sports, and Bill Wolfinger forecasting the weather. Bill Wolfinger also did a Saturday night horror movie show where he would be in costume similar to Lon Chaney. The news department expanded in 1972 to include weekend evening broadcasts at 11 that totaled six hours of local news per week. By the year 2000, news content increased to over 22 hours of broadcasts per week. In 1997, WHAG added a microwave truck allowing the transmitting of live breaking news from the viewing area. On February 12, 2010, WHAG dropped the "NBC 25" branding for "WHAG" and switched its news branding from NBC 25 News to WHAG News.

Outside of a few senior staffers, the station's news department mainly acted as a "farm team" operation that features new journalists and behind the scenes staff who have graduated from their schools looking for experience at a small-market television station and serve as "one man band" personnel that shoot, write, and edit their own stories, and eventually move on to further opportunities in larger markets. The station operates a bureau on East Patrick Street (MD 144) in Frederick.

On August 30, 2010, WHAG added a half hour to its weekday noon and 5 p.m. newscasts. Until this point unlike most NBC affiliates in the Eastern Time Zone, the station had not aired a broadcast weeknights at 5:30. It still does not offer a full two-hour weekday morning show. There is now a half hour broadcast seen Monday through Saturday nights at 7. On weekends, an hour-long morning show at 6 as well as a half hour Sunday morning broadcast at 9 were added. In addition, a Northern Virginia Bureau covering Chantilly, Leesburg, Berryville, and Winchester was opened. Although not a full news department, this is now the second local news operation established in those areas after TV3 Winchester launched back on March 5, 2007. All of the preceding changes required the expansion of WHAG's personnel. On October 21, 2013, WHAG began broadcasting its local newscasts in high definition.

Nexstar undertook a major expansion of WDVM-TV's news operation that launched on July 1, 2016, the same day the station lost its NBC affiliation. While it broadcasts standard newscasts at 5:30 a.m., 6 a.m., noon, 5 p.m., 6 p.m., and 10 p.m., the 7 a.m., 7 p.m., and 11 p.m. hours are also set aside for Maryland- (I-270 News) and Northern Virginia-specific (Nova News) coverage. WDVM-TV also simulcasts Nexstar-owned WOWK-TV's Tonight Live at 5:30 p.m.

On July 11, 2022, Nexstar moved WDVM-TV's primary studios from Hagerstown to Washington and rebranded newscasts as DC News Now, along with changing many of the on-air personalities and anchor lineup. The former WDVM-TV studios in Hagerstown are now used as a bureau, alongside the existing Frederick and Chantilly bureaus. On July 25, 2022, another newscast expansion occurred, with the morning news expanding to four hours, the 5 p.m. news expanding to an hour (which also resulted in the move of the WOWK-produced Tonight Live to 11:30 p.m.), and the addition of a new 9 p.m. newscast. WDVM-TV's 10 p.m. newscast moved to WDCW and the 11 p.m. newscast was replaced by a half-hour sports program.

Subchannels
The station's digital signal is multiplexed:

WHAG's broadcasts became digital-only, effective June 12, 2009.

As part of the spectrum repacking process following the FCC's incentive auction, WDVM changed from channel 26 to 23 on August 2, 2019. However, their virtual channel number remains 25 through the use of PSIP.

The effective reach of WDVM-TV's signal is the valley stretching from Hagerstown to Martinsburg, West Virginia, and Winchester, Virginia, far from the core of the Washington market. Its main channel only is simulcast in 480i widescreen standard definition (virtual channel 25.1) on the Washington-based signal of WDCW in order to cover the rest of the market.

Cable and satellite carriage
Recently, it has been added to the Dish Network lineup of local offerings and is available to subscribers that currently receive the Washington, D.C. market locals. WDVM-TV had also been seen on Dish as the default NBC affiliate for the Salisbury television market, as that market did not have an NBC affiliate of its own until June 2014, when WRDE-LD in nearby Rehoboth Beach, Delaware, switched its affiliation to NBC. It is also viewed in widescreen standard definition on Verizon FiOS in Montgomery County, Maryland.

On February 26, 2020, WDVM-TV was added to DirecTV's lineup of local offerings and, like with rival Dish, is also available to subscribers that currently receive the Washington, D.C. market locals. It is seen on channel 25 and only in high definition.

References

External links

DVM-TV
Independent television stations in the United States
Ion Mystery affiliates
Rewind TV affiliates
Television channels and stations established in 1970
1970 establishments in Maryland
Mass media in Hagerstown metropolitan area
Nexstar Media Group
Heroes & Icons affiliates